The Etowah Subdivision is a railroad line owned by CSX Transportation in the U.S. states of Tennessee and Georgia. At its north end it continues south from the KD Subdivision and at its south end it continues south as the W&A Subdivision.

See also
 List of CSX Transportation lines

References

CSX Transportation lines